Louis Charles Adler (April 18, 1929 – December 22, 2017) was an American radio journalist, director of Quinnipiac University's Ed McMahon Mass Communication Center, and also was Quinnipiac's Fred Friendly-endowed Professor of Broadcast Journalism.

Adler was born in Jamestown, New York. A longtime morning news anchor on WCBS in New York, Adler was credited with popularizing the "talk news radio" format on WCBS during the late 1960s. From 1969 to 1980, Adler also served as WCBS' general manager and/or news director, (sometimes concurrently.) After his retirement, he became owner of WKFD, an AM radio station in Wickford, Rhode Island. He died on December 22, 2017, in Meriden, Connecticut at the age of 88 from Alzheimer's disease.

References

Sources 

https://web.archive.org/web/20080517115729/http://www.quinnipiac.edu/x1000.xml
http://donswaim.com/wcbs.gms.html

1929 births
2017 deaths
American radio journalists
Quinnipiac University faculty
People from Jamestown, New York
20th-century American journalists
American male journalists